KIMEP University (formerly: Kazakhstan Institute of Management, Economics and Strategic Research) is an institution of higher education in Almaty, Kazakhstan. KIMEP is a private, non-profit university offering credit-based, North American-style bachelor's, master's, and doctoral degree curricula. Most classes are taught in English.

History

KIMEP was founded in 1992 under the instructions of Kazakhstan President Nursultan Nazarbayev. KIMEP's campus in south-central Almaty occupied the premises of the former Central Training School of the Communist Party of Kazakhstan. It was among the first private institutions of higher education founded in the former Soviet Union.  Nazarbayev appointed Chan-Young Bang, his former economic advisor president, as the institute's first executive director.

The first MBA and MA in Economics programs were launched in 1992 and the MPA program began enrolling students in 1993. The first class, consisting of 81 MBA and MA students, graduated from KIMEP in 1994.

In 1998 the International Executive Center was created with the help of McGill University, Montreal, Quebec, Canada. In 1999 KIMEP introduced its first four-year bachelor programs in Business Administration and Social Sciences. 424 students enrolled in the undergraduate program.

In 2001 KIMEP became the first institution in Central Asia to implement an American-style course credit system for all academic programs. This system gives students flexibility to choose their courses and instructors.

Over the course of the decade, KIMEP launched new master's degrees, a Doctor of Business Administration program, a leadership certificate and many professional programs. Enrollment increased by a factor of ten. The campus saw significant renovation, including a new library, new academic building and gym.

In 2000, Chan-Young Bang became president of KIMEP, a position he holds today. In 2004, KIMEP became a private, non-profit educational institution, with a 60% stake held by Dr. Bang and a 40% held by the Ministry of Education and Science of the Republic of Kazakhstan.

On 2 April 2008, President Nazarbayev visited the KIMEP campus, toured the newest buildings and met with students. In 2008 the institute awarded nearly 600 bachelor's degrees and 152 master's degrees.

In 2011, the Bang College of Business received regional (level II) accreditation from the Asian Forum on Business Education. According to a statement on KIMEP's website, "the award confirms that KIMEP is two to four years from achieving the ‘gold standard’ of global business school accreditation – AASCB and EQUIS. This is in line with KIMEP's own strategy to achieve this recognition in the next three years."

On February 8, 2012, KIMEP received confirmation from the Ministry of Justice of the Republic of Kazakhstan that its status has been changed. The institute would now operate under the name KIMEP University. This change was effective January 26, 2012, when the ministry officially accepted the new charter of the university and issued a new certificate of state registration.

On December 4, 2020, KIMEP University Law School hosted an online One-Day Workshop of the Legal Writing Institute.

Admissions
The KIMEP Admissions Department accepts applications to all its academic programs on a rolling basis. Undergraduate admissions decisions are based on the KIMEP entrance exam, which is held throughout the year in cities across Kazakhstan. The Admissions Department also considers students’ academic performance at previous institutions and the results of the KIMEP English Examination Test. A decent level of English is required for admissions, but most students do not obtain full proficiency until after they begin their studies.

KIMEP's financial aid has rapidly grown since 2004. In 2010–2011, KIMEP offered nearly four million dollars in combined internal and external scholarships. Internal funding amounted to 2.3 million dollars. 100 percent of applicants for the 2010-2011 year who applied for aid and demonstrated need and academic achievements received financial assistance.

Another 60 million Kazakhstani tenge (US$408,163) is given to students who work on campus as office assistants. Another form of financial assistance at KIMEP is placement in the KIMEP Dormitory, which offers highly favorable rates to students from outside Almaty.

Financial aid is available to undergraduate and graduate students. Merit scholarships are granted to students in all degree programs.

Academics

Divisions and programs
 KIMEP has four academic colleges and two learning centers:

Colleges 
The Bang College of Business (BCB), named after President Chan-Young Bang, offers a Bachelor of Science in Business Administration, a Master of Business Administration and a PhD in management, marketing, accounting and finance areas. The dean of BCB is Dr Jay Hoyoung Lee, Associate professor of marketing, former chief finance officer of Samsung C&T.

The College of Social Sciences (CSS) offers bachelor's and master's degrees in four fields: economics, public administration, international relations, and international journalism. The dean of CSS is Dr Gerald Pech, Associate Professor of Economics. His fields of specialization are game theory, public economics and the economic analysis of institutions.

The School of Law offers a Master of Laws (or LLM) in International Law and an undergraduate LLB law course, which launched in 2011–2012. The dean of Law school is Dr Fred Mitchell Isaacs. He was a commercial litigation associate in two large law firms, a federal judicial law clerk to one district and three appellate court judges, and spent 18 years as a business law professor before moving to Kazakhstan.

College of Humanities and Education (CHE), a newly created college in 2019, former Language Center (LC). This college offers three bachelor's degree courses in Foreign Language, Translation Studies, Cognitive Science, and two master's degree courses in Foreign Languages (TESOL), and MA and PhD programs in Education policy and Management. The dean of the college is Juldyz Smagulova, PhD. Dr. Smagulova teaches graduate courses Introduction to Second Language Acquisition, Second Language Acquisition Research, Introduction to Sociolinguistics, and Introduction to Bilingualism as well undergraduate Academic English courses. She provides consulting in the areas of language planning and policy and conducts trainings for language teachers.

Learning Centers 

The Language Center administers the English language foundation course, which most students must take upon entry to KIMEP. The Language Center teaches courses in English, Russian, Kazakh, Chinese, Korean, German. It offers a master's degree in teaching English to speakers of other languages (MA in TESOL). First-year undergraduates at KIMEP take interdisciplinary courses from the Language Center as a part of the general education program.

In addition, KIMEP has an Executive Education Center (EEC), which offers dozens of certificate courses and professional development programs to adults and professionals in Almaty. It offers courses to high school students preparing them for the KIMEP entrance examination, delivers KIMEP's Leadership Development Program, and coordinates KIMEP's Executive MBA with BCB.

Rankings 
In 2019, the Independent Quality Assurance Agency of Kazakhstan (IQAA) named KIMEP the best humanitarian-economic university in Kazakhstan.

This followed a strong showing in rankings from the National Accreditation Center of the Ministry of Education and Science of RK, where five KIMEP Bachelor programs came in first, and five came in second:

 first rank – “International Law”
 first rank – “Economics”
 first rank – “Accounting and Audit”
 first rank – “International Relations”
 first rank – “Finance”
 second rank – “Marketing”
 second rank – “Management”
 second rank – “Public Administration”
 second rank – “Jurisprudence”
 second rank – “Journalism”

KIMEP Master programs:

 first rank – “International Relations”
 first rank – “Accounting and Audit”
 first rank – “Arts in Foreign Languages: Two Foreign Languages”
 first rank – “ExMBA”
 second rank – “International Law”
 second rank – “International Journalism”

License and attestation 
KIMEP has a license to offer academic programs from the Ministry of Education and Science of the Republic (MES) of Kazakhstan. The last visit of an attestation commission from the Ministry was in 2013, which KIMEP passed successfully. After a while the State attestations have been cancelled.

KIMEP is in the process of applying for accreditation at international accreditation agencies. The Bang College of Business has received regional (level II) accreditation from the Asian Forum on Business Education, making KIMEP the first academic institution in Central Asia to receive this honor. The Department of Public Administration received unconditional accreditation from the European Association for Public Administration Accreditation, another first for Central Asia. The American Communication Association granted conditional accreditation to KIMEP's journalism and communication programs, with full program accreditation a possibility following a one-year review.

In 2018 KIMEP received International Accreditation for all programs from Foundation for International Business Administration accreditation  (FIBAA) until 2023.

In 2019 the university received an Institutional Accreditation from FIBAA until 2025.

KIMEP has the following specialized memberships:

 Department of Public Administration: member of NASPAA, the National Association of Schools of Public Affairs and Administration
 Bang College of Business: member of AACSB International, the Association to Advance Collegiate Schools of Business; member of AFBE, Asian Forum on Business Education; member of American Chamber of Commerce

Campus

KIMEP's campus in south-central Almaty occupies the premises of the former Central Training School of the Communist Party of Kazakhstan. 
It includes three main academic buildings, a library, sports center, dormitory, various fields, benches and other facilities.

Library
The Olivier Giscard d'Estaing Library (OGEL), named after the founding dean of INSEAD and supporter of KIMEP throughout its early years, has the largest English-language collection in Central Asia (approximately 64,000) in addition to large Russian and Kazakh collections (approximately 36,000 total). The main collection specializes in publications on business, social sciences, law and languages. It offers KIMEP students access to dozens of major electronic libraries and electronic resources. The library has space for studying, an electronic resources laboratory and a large computer room. OGEL librarians have created a major database of reference materials on Central Asia, which they continually update.

Sports Center

In November 2010, KIMEP opened a new Sports Center. The 325-square-meter facility includes a basketball court, two fitness rooms and a yoga studio. All the technology is state-of-the-art and imported from South Korea. Beginning in 2011, the Sports Center offered a variety of curricular and extra-curricular courses to students. Students have free access to the facility, which will be open six days a week.

ExxonMobil Media Center

In October 2009, KIMEP launched a media laboratory for its journalism students. The facility was named the ExxonMobil Media Center after ExxonMobil Kazakhstan, which donated US$44,000 to pay for the center's equipment. The digital equipment enables students to work with internet publications, digital photography, cinematography, sound, editing, and advertising.

Student life
About 3,000 students enroll to KIMEP each semester. The average age of enrolled bachelor's degrees students was 19.5. Roughly 50% of KIMEP students come from outside Almaty. There are students (including exchange students) from more than 25 countries, including the United States, Spain, South Korea, Tajikistan, India, China, Peru, Kyrgyzstan and Uzbekistan.

The KIMEP Students Association is a student-elected body to represent the interests of students to the administration. The KSA participates with full voting rights on all management committees, typically holding around 30 percent of seats on each committee.  The KSA is also responsible for organizing and providing funding for all student clubs at KIMEP. Madi Tanatarov is the president of KSA in 2019–2020.

There are more than 30 student clubs at KIMEP, including the Kimep Fashion Industry, eClub (Entrepreneurship Club), KIMEP Times, Kimep Voice, Future Business Group, KIMEP Film Society, Intellectual Debate Club, Math Club, Luca Accounting Club, Zhas Kenes Charity Group, CrEAteam and KVN. In addition, there is a weekly English Club run by native speakers.

The Leadership Development Program invites guest lectures from the business, politics and academia in Kazakhstan and around the world to speak to students about personal development, leadership and other issues. The certificate-granting program gives students the chance to hear speakers such as Keith Gaebel, the managing partner of Central Asia and Caucasus at Ernst & Young, Ilya Urazakov, Kazakhstan broadcaster and businessman, and Karel Holub, general manager of Nokia Corporation for the South CIS.

Housing
A citywide survey in 2010 awarded KIMEP for having the best dormitory in Almaty.

Alumni
So far KIMEP has graduated more than 12,000 alumni. The KIMEP Alumni Association organizes events and networking for alumni of all programs. KIMEP alumni tend to work in the private and public sectors. According to a 2019 study, nearly 96% of KIMEP graduates had full-time employment within three months of graduation.

Notable alumni include:
Aida Sapargasinova (ExMBA 2004), General-Director of FoodMaster
Asel Karaulova (MBA 1994), President of Press Club of Kazakhstan
Baurzhan Burkhanbekov (MBA 1997), Director, PricewaterhouseCoopers Kazakhstan
Dinara Kulibayeva (Nazarbayeva) (MBA 1998), Director of Nursultan Nazarbayev Education Fund
Rinad Temirbekov (MBA 1999), Director of Eurasia Foundation, Kazakhstan
Marat Saidnasmov (MBA 2000), General Director, Legrand Kazakhstan
Dmitriy Lengardt (MBA 1999), CEO of NAYADA
Oleg Tsurkan (MBA 1994), managing director, BTA Bank
Galina Umarova (MPA 2000), Vice President of Air Astana
Gani Uzbekov (MA 1997), Vice Chairman of Board, HSBC Kazakhstan
Dmitriy Yeremeyev (MBA 1994), General Director, Richmond Group, Moscow
Sanzhar Kozybayev (MA 1999), vice-president of Visor Capital LLP

Faculty and research

KIMEP has over 200 faculty members coming from more than 40 countries. KIMEP has 84 instructors with terminal degrees, 77 of which have PhDs. This is the highest such concentration of any institution in the CIS. KIMEP professors come from a wide variety of background and their combined research output has steadily increased over the past few years.

KIMEP espouses “student-centered” education. All instructors maintain office hours during which they are available to meet personally with students. Classes are meant to include class discussion and critical analysis of subject matter.

Research focuses on issues critical to Central Asia's long-term development. Last year, KIMEP faculty members attended more than 100 conferences and published more than 110 articles and books.

Notable faculty members include:
Amin Aloysius Ajab, Chair of the Economics Department, economics and development scholar, former deputy director and Head of Training at the United Nations African Institute for Economic Development and Planning (IDEP)
Zhuldyzbek Abylkhoznin, a famous scholar of Kazakhstan History;
John JA Burke, widely published scholar, former Rector and Professor of Law of the Riga Graduate School of Law, Latvia
Nadeem Naqvi, former chief economist at the World Bank Johannesburg. Dr Naqvi is a full-time faculty member at KIMEP University starting from 2013.
John Dixon, public policy scholar, published in over 29 books and refereed in over 150 articles
Zhenis Kembayev, scholar of Public International Law, Law of the European Union and Constitutional Law of Kazakhstan, expert in the field of regional integration theory and regional integration processes in the post-Soviet states
Gavin Kretzschmar, PricewaterhouseCoopers Chair of Accounting, co-serves as Director of Finance and Risk at the University of Edinburgh, formerly the Finance Director of Standard Bank (SA) Retail
Kanat Kudaibergenov, mathematician
Tomas Balco, an internationally recognized tax expert and founder of the Central Asian Tax Research Center at KIMEP
Roman Podoprigora, frequent consultant to the Supreme Court and Ministry of Justice of Kazakhstan; Deputy Chair, Financial & Tax Law Research Institute, since 2008.
Vassily Voinov, statistician, major developer of extensions of khi-square distributions

Partner universities 
KIMEP has active partnerships with more than 95 universities. One third of these universities are ranked in the top 100 by the Times Higher Education Supplement. Last academic year, 175 KIMEP students enrolled in study abroad programs, while KIMEP hosted more than 300 international students. Some of KIMEP's partner universities are:

KIMEP has established several dual degree programs with leading universities outside of Kazakhstan. This includes:
 Humboldt University Berlin, Germany (MA Economics/MSc in Economics and Management Science
 University of Glasgow, UK (MIR/Master in Russian, Central and Eastern European Studies
 IESEG School of Management/Catholic University of Lille, France (MBA/MIB) 
 EM Strasbourg Business School/University of Strasbourg, France (BSc Business & Accounting/Bachelor in European Management 
 Yonsei University, South Korea (MA Economics/Master in Global Economy & Strategy, MIR/Master is Global Affairs & Policy, MIR/MA Korean Studies, MIR/Master in Global Economy & Strategy)

Criticism

In 2006 certain former faculty members published letters accusing the university of corruption and cronyism. In a letter to the Chronicle of Higher Education, the former faculty members claimed contracts and salaries were "compromised" at the institution. Former faculty published another letter in the opposition newspaper Respublika which accused several administrators of professional misconduct and lack of qualifications. The letter addressed the awarding of KIMEP tenders to USKO, a company chaired by Dr. Bang.

Responding in the same newspaper, Bang claimed that the accusations by the former faculty were not true. He noted that in 2006, 95% of KIMEP employees said they would recommend the school as a good place to work. He said four faculty members were regrettably fired because "their actions did not correspond to the mission and goals of the institute". He noted that those faculty members who left KIMEP voluntarily usually did so for personal reasons or because their time in Kazakhstan had come to a scheduled end. The letter also pointed out that out of eleven on-going or recently completed construction projects at KIMEP, only two were done by USKO, and that all such projects at KIMEP are examined by an independent committee.

In September 2010, the Ministry of Education and Science issued a decree showing an intention to suspend KIMEP's license for six months. The Ministry cited technical issues such as student-teacher ratio, classroom sizes and the templates of diplomas for the suspension. KIMEP filed an appeal against the suspension in Astana and continued to operate. Observers pointed out that the university had been operating for almost two decades and suggested that the sudden emergence of this problem after such a long period was politically motivated. Two weeks later, the Ministry fully reinstated KIMEP's license, stating that all violations had been resolved. Zhansit Tuimebayev, the Minister of Education and Science who had issued the suspension of KIMEP's license, was moved to a different government position and replaced by Bakhytzhan Zhumagulov.

See also
 Education in Kazakhstan

References

External links
 KIMEP - Official website

1992 establishments in Kazakhstan
KIMEP University
Educational institutions established in 1992